Paul William Sparkes (born 3 August 1960) is a male retired British swimmer. Sparkes competed in the men's 1500 metre freestyle at the 1976 Summer Olympics. At the ASA National British Championships he won the 1500 metres freestyle title  and the 200 metres butterfly title in 1977.

References

External links
 

1960 births
Living people
British male swimmers
Olympic swimmers of Great Britain
Swimmers at the 1976 Summer Olympics
Place of birth missing (living people)